Breaking Ground - New Directions in Country Music is a compilation album of Australian contemporary country music. It was produced by John Spence and released in Australia by ABC Records in 1990. It was nominated for a 1991 ARIA Award for Best Country Album. The album inspired two Breaking Ground concerts which featured many of the artists that appeared on the release. The album was nominated for Album of the Year at the 1991 Australasian Country Music Awards. Anne Kirkpatrick's contribution saw her nominated for Female Vocalist of the Year at the same awards.

Singles
The album's last track "Wait For The Light To Shine" was released as a single backed by "Up On The Mountain (instrumental)

Awards

Track listing

 Until the next big dry - James Blundell
 Prodigal son  - The Kanes
 There's a light on  - Keith Urban
 Till you love me again - Anne Kirkpatrick
 Loosen my necktie  - The Danglin' Bros
 Up on the mountain  - The Breaking Ground Band
 How come  - Blue Healers
 Time will tell  - The Happening Thang
 It makes no difference  - Jenine Vaughan
 Lonesome, lonely & alone  - Mary-Jo Starr
 Country man - Fargone Beauties
 Wait for the light to shine - Various
The final track on the album was performed by all of the artists that appear on the earlier tracks.

References

Compilation albums by Australian artists
1990 compilation albums